Kentucky Minstrels is a 1934 British musical film directed by John Baxter. It was made at Twickenham Studios as a quota quickie for release by Universal Pictures.  Scott and Whaley, the stars of the film, were an African American comedy duo, and the first black performers to take a leading role in a British film.  It also featured American actress Nina Mae McKinney. The show derived from the BBC radio programme, The Kentucky Minstrels, first broadcast in 1933, which was written and performed by the same team.

Stephen Bourne, writing in The Independent, referred to the film's "brilliant musical finale".

Cast
 Harry Scott as Pussy-Foot  
 Eddie Whaley as Cuthbert  
 C. Denier Warren as Danny Goldman  
 April Vivian as Maggie  
 Wilson Coleman as Ben  
 Madge Brindley as Landlady  
 Roddy Hughes as Town Clerk 
 Norman Greene as Massa Johnson 
 Terence Casey 
 Edgar Driver 
 Jack Gerrard
 Leslie Hatton and His White Coons as Themselves
 Nina Mae McKinney
 Harry S. Pepper and His Band as Themselves
 Leo Sheffield 
 Debroy Somers 
 Polly Ward 
 Josie Woods as Dancer

References

Bibliography
 Low, Rachael. Filmmaking in 1930s Britain. George Allen & Unwin, 1985.
 Wood, Linda. British Films, 1927-1939. British Film Institute, 1986.

External links

1934 films
British musical films
1934 musical films
1930s English-language films
Films shot at Twickenham Film Studios
Films directed by John Baxter
Quota quickies
Universal Pictures films
British black-and-white films
1930s British films